René Dereuddre (22 June 1930 – 16 April 2008) was a French footballer who played midfielder.

He played for CO Roubaix-Tourcoing, Toulouse FC, RC Lens, Angers SCO, FC Nantes, FC Grenoble and US Le Mans. He coached US Le Mans.

References

External links
 Profile
 Profile
 Décès de René Dereuddre, FFF

1930 births
2008 deaths
People from Bully-les-Mines
French footballers
France international footballers
Association football midfielders
Ligue 1 players
Ligue 2 players
RC Lens players
Angers SCO players
FC Nantes players
Grenoble Foot 38 players
1954 FIFA World Cup players
French football managers
Le Mans FC managers
CO Roubaix-Tourcoing players
Sportspeople from Pas-de-Calais
Footballers from Hauts-de-France